Jean-Baptiste Berthier (1721–1804) was an officer (Lieutenant-Colonel) in the French Corps of Topographical Engineers during the reigns of Louis XV and Louis XVI.

Biography

Early life
Jean-Baptiste Berthier was born on 6 January 1721 in Tonnerre, France.

Career
After attracting the attention of marchal de camp Charles Louis Auguste Fouquet, duc de Belle-Isle, he was deputed by him to supervise construction of several prominent Paris public buildings, notably those of the ministries of war, navy and foreign affairs in Versailles.

In 1758, he was made Director of Military Survey to King Louis XV, a position he retained with Louis XVI for whom he prepared the famous topographic maps of the Royal hunting grounds.

Personal life
He married his first wife, Marie Françoise L'Huillier de La Serre, in 1746. They had five children. The oldest of five children, Louis Alexandre Berthier (1753), would become Marshal of France, with the other three sons also serving in the French Army: Charles (1760) in North America, while César (1765) and Victor-Léopold (1770) became generals during the Napoleonic Wars. His only daughter is only remembered as Madame d'Ogeranville.

Widowed, he remarried Françoise Chéron. They had a son Alexandre Joseph Berthier (1792–1849), who married his cousin Thérèse Léopoldine Berthier (1806–1882), and had issue, Viscounts Berthier de Wagram, extinct in 1949.

Death
He died on May 21, 1804 in Paris, France.

References

Sources
 Watson, S.J., By Command of the Emperor: A Life of Marshal Berthier, The Bodley Head, London, 1957
 Junot Abrantès, Laure, Memoirs of Napoleon, His Court and Family, R. Bentley, London, 1836

1721 births
1804 deaths
People from Tonnerre, Yonne
18th-century French architects
18th-century French cartographers
Knights of the Order of Saint Louis